A soft launch, also known as a soft opening, is a preview release of a product or service to a limited audience prior to the general public. Soft-launching a product is sometimes used to gather data or customer feedback, prior to making it widely available during an official release or grand opening. A company may also choose a soft launch to test the functionality of a product, allowing adjustments to be made before a wider release and marketing efforts are implemented.

Computer related 
When implementing a soft launch strategy, a company releases a product with little or no marketing. A soft launch permits a company to react to customer demands quickly and effectively, introducing new features which will ultimately make the product successful. For companies with a limited budget, a soft launch can allow them to focus on product development rather than marketing.

Website 
Soft launches can be used with websites to help roll out new features, test or tweak a design (or possible redesign) allowing a design which users dislike to be quietly retired. Changes can also be made to increase the functionality of the website and respond to user requests. Gmail, for example, was soft launched in 2005 and fully launched one year later.

Hardware 
In the instance of hardware products, a limited release soft launch can be used to test the market prior to a wide scale release. It also means companies are allowed to make last minute changes to the product after the soft launch. In many instances, soft launches of hardware are done in major metropolitan areas where the company has access to a wide variety of demographic groups.

Software 
Soft launches are also used for software, with a small release being made to a limited group of individuals for beta testing. Software can be extensively tested by the releasing company, but ultimately it needs to be used to determine how effective it is. Major flaws in the design may emerge during beta testing and can be corrected before the product is released into a major market.

Some software is soft launched on the Internet, which allows for easy software updates. Early beta testers can grow attached to the program and will continue to download new versions as they are released. Thus, companies often build up a loyal customer base, which spreads the word to other potential customers.

Mobile apps 
Before committing to a hard launch in the United States, developers creating English mobile applications may choose to launch unofficially in less populous countries such as Australia, Canada, and New Zealand, to refine the app by analyzing usage and spending habits, which are thought to be similar to those in the United States. This may also reduce the chances of the American press noticing the app. Canada has the additional benefit of having similar time zones to the United States. Soft launches are popular for free-to-play mobile games.

Brick and mortar establishments
When a brick and mortar business wishes to open prior to its grand opening (to test its capacity and train its staff), this may be referred to as a soft launch or soft opening.

When a business wishes to close but still allow customers to shop, this is referred to as a soft close.

The term test event is often used in sports, especially in the UK, to refer to events held in a newly constructed sports venue before its official opening. For example, a newly built venue in the UK is required to host two events at reduced capacity, with the second event using a larger capacity than the first, before being granted a safety certificate that allows it to hold events at full capacity.

On social media 
The term "soft launch" has been used by social media influencers to hint at the existence of a significant other without making a formal announcement, as a subtler alternative to a "boyfriend reveal". Examples can include posting pictures of food or drink for two or a selfie in an unfamiliar location.

References 

 
Innovation
Product development
Product management
Product testing